Travel III EP is the sixth album by the Christian rock band Future of Forestry, and the third in the "Travel Series." The recording of the album “officially” started on February 11. It was released on June 29, 2010. Frontman Eric Owyoung wrote all of the songs for this EP and his wife, Tamara Owyoung, painted the cover art for the album. The band subsequently departed on what was called "The 3 Tour" to go along with the release. The tour was self-booked and took place in the West and Midwest regions of the United States starting on June 27, 2010 and ending on July 13, 2010.

Track listing
The names (and respective order) of the songs were released on the band's Myspace page leading up to the release of the CD, as they did for the rest of the Travel Series EPs. However, on Travel III, for the first time, Future of Forestry released the tracks out-of-order.

 "Bold and Underlined" - 4:04
 "Working to Be Loved" - 3:48
 "Did You Lose Yourself" - 4:47
 "Protection" - 4:14
 "Horizon Rainfall" - 2:53
 "Your Day's Not Over" - 5:00

Awards
The album was nominated for a Dove Award for Rock Album of the Year at the 42nd GMA Dove Awards.

References 

2010 EPs
Future of Forestry albums